The term puku can have several meanings:

Donga Puku Matta Ganesh

Puku is a dialect of the ut-Ma'in language of Nigeria
Puku is a dialect of the Noho language of Cameroon
Puku is the name of an Aquapet toy
Puku is a Japanese counter word
Puku is a Māori term used as a loanword in New Zealand English, meaning belly or centre. It found in several place names
Te Puku, an island of Tokelau
Te Puku O Te Whenua, a former New Zealand electorate